Steven Gary Jones (born 17 March 1970) is an English former professional footballer who played as a striker.

Career
Jones started his footballing career at non-League clubs Basildon United and then Billericay Town. He had been working at a local soap factory and earning £250 per week before moving to West Ham who increased his wages to £400 per week.

He moved to West Ham United in November 1992 for £22,500 rising to £45,000 based on appearances, and made his first senior appearance for the East London club in a reserve fixture against Southampton on 17 November 1992. He made his first-team debut away to Cosenza Calcio 1914 in the Anglo-Italian Cup on 8 December 1992, and set up the only goal of the game for Clive Allen. His first goal for the club came against Barnsley in a 1–1 home draw on 6 February 1993, ten minutes into his full Football League First Division debut. Jones also scored against Peterborough three days later in a 2–1 home win for the Hammers.

Jones made just three Premier League starts and five appearances as a substitute during the 1993–94 campaign before joining AFC Bournemouth in October 1994. Despite his lack of action that season, Jones is remembered by West Ham fans for opening the scoring in a memorable 1–4 away win against London rivals Tottenham Hotspur on Easter Monday 1994, after coming on as a substitute in the first half.

In January 1996, after a successful spell at the south coast club, West Ham manager Harry Redknapp again brought the player back to Upton Park for a fee of £200,000, with Mark Watson moving to Dean Court. During his second spell with West Ham he was partnered with Mike Newell as twin strikers. With the pair both failing to score goals manager Redknapp bought Paul Kitson and John Hartson to provide the goals needed to keep West Ham from relegation and Jones was allowed to leave. He joined Charlton Athletic in February 1997 for £400,000. He played in their dramatic win over Sunderland in the 1998 play-off final, winning 7–6 on penalties after a 4–4 draw. He had been nominated as the eighth penalty taker, if required.

After another short spell at Bournemouth, Jones moved to Bristol City for fee of £425,000 and then had loan spells at Brentford, Southend United and Wycombe Wanderers. He became player-coach for Isthmian League team Hornchurch in June 2002. Jones was forced to retire from professional football due to injury.

Personal life
Jones is the founder of Langdon Pumas, a youth football club in Basildon.

References

External links
Steve Jones at Soccerbase

1970 births
Living people
Sportspeople from Cambridge
English footballers
Association football forwards
Basildon United F.C. players
Billericay Town F.C. players
West Ham United F.C. players
AFC Bournemouth players
Charlton Athletic F.C. players
Bristol City F.C. players
Brentford F.C. players
Southend United F.C. players
Wycombe Wanderers F.C. players
Premier League players
English Football League players
Hornchurch F.C. players
Association football coaches